The Champions League 2008–09 is the season of EHF Champions League.

Teams

Qualification round

Group stage

Group A

Group B

Group C

Group D

Group E

Group F

Group G

Group H

Main round

Group 1

Group 2

Group 3

Group 4

Knockout stage

Quarterfinals

Semifinals

Final

Top scorers

Source:

References

External links
Official site

 
C
C
EHF Champions League seasons